Philadelphia and Delaware County Railroad may refer to:
Philadelphia and Delaware County Railroad (1831–1836), Philadelphia to Wilmington
Philadelphia and Delaware County Railroad (1890–1913) near Lansdowne